The Greek punk scene was small but powerful in the Greek capital, Athens, in the 1980s. Bands such as Adiexodo (Dead end), Genia Tou Chaous (Chaos generation), Stress, Panx Romana, Ex-humans, Anti (Contra) functioned as a bunch of related bands, who gave concerts together, in the same locations. Like elsewhere, punk attitude has been loosely used by various individuals, but most of the times the key element was the youthful anger and the provocative anti-establishment attitude.

Many newer crust and hardcore punk bands such as Ksehasmeni Profitia (Gr:ξεχασμένη προφητεία) (Forgotten prophecy), Naftia (Nausea), Deus Ex Machina and others of the 1990s followed DIY ethics, gradually forming a small but powerful network in most big Greek cities. This network has sometimes been linked with local anarchist-related groups, squats, cultural/social/left-wing centers. Most of the concerts of punk bands in Greece have no, or minimal, entrance fee and many of them are arranged according to DIY ethics.

Contemporary punk bands have seldom managed to form a solid scene outside that DIY / anarchopunk movement, but sometimes a band might attract an enthusiastic core of dedicated fans, such as in the Oi! or streetpunk subgenres. Few attempts have been made to document information about Greek punk; one of those being a limited edition brochure of Anarchist Library (Anarhiki Vivliothiki). Some Greek webzines have also documented Greek punk history.

Notable Bands
Deus Ex Machina
Panx Romana
Genia Tou Chaous
Adiexodo
Naftia
Moot Point
The Clash Tribute

See also
Greek rock

Further reading
 Η Ιστορία των Punk, Hardcore και αλλων σχηματων, Αναρχική Αρχειοθήκη

External links
Punk.gr information on Greek punk in English (Archived)
Greek Punk/Crust/HC and more page on Greek punk movement and punk collective 
Diymusic site on Greek diy movement
Anexartisi site with many resources, also many Greek rock bands
Words and Stuff articles on Greek punk, punk rock show reviews and zines
squathost more links
Greek_Punk_blogspot Downloads, lives ...

 
Music scenes
Punk by country